El Putxet i Farró (not el Putget i el Farró) is a neighbourhood in the Sarrià-Sant Gervasi district of Barcelona, Catalonia (Spain), located on a hill between Vallcarca and Sant Gervasi, urbanised after the 1870s. It is formed by two quarters, the former neighborhoods of el Putxet and el Farró.

El Putxet
The primarily residential neighborhood Putxet is named after the hill (elevation ) on which it is located (El turó del Putxet in Catalan meaning the knoll of the hill). The uppermost part of the hill is covered by the public park 'gardens of the hill of Putxet' (Parc del Turó del Putxet in Catalan, see image). This park was inaugurated in 1970 and covers 3.97 hectares.

El Farró
The residential neighbourhood of El Farró is considered by its residents to be very family friendly. Several activities are organized throughout the year in one of its squares, such as food markets, music performances and events for kids during important festivities. The atmosphere is similar to the one of a small town, thanks to its small streets and low buildings. Most of its streets have undergone a renovation in the last few years to become more adapted to pedestrians, eliminating parking spots and considerably reducing the circulating traffic.

El Farró is limited by main busy streets and two main squares (Plaça de Lesseps and Plaça Molina), thus making it an oasis in the center of a bustling area of the city. Several transportation options, restaurants and basic stores are available at a very short walking distance.
Fans of modernist architecture can find "Cases Ramos" in Plaça de Lesseps, three lesser known but still very impressive modernist apartment buildings, built in 1906 by the architect Jaume Torras i Grau.

Transport
Ferrocarrils de la Generalitat de Catalunya and Barcelona Metro station Putxet, on L7.
Barcelona Metro station Lesseps, on L3.

References

External links
BCN.es website

Neighbourhoods of Barcelona
Sarrià-Sant Gervasi